Cryptolepidus is a genus of broad-nosed weevils in the beetle family Curculionidae. There are about eight described species in Cryptolepidus.

Species
These eight species belong to the genus Cryptolepidus:
 Cryptolepidus aridus Tanner, 1966 i c g
 Cryptolepidus boulderensis (Tanner, 1950) i c g
 Cryptolepidus cazieri (Van Dyke, 1936) i c g
 Cryptolepidus leechi Ting, 1940 i c g b
 Cryptolepidus nevadicus (Van Dyke, 1936) i c g
 Cryptolepidus parvulus Van Dyke, 1936 c g
 Cryptolepidus planifrons Ting, 1940 i c g
 Cryptolepidus rugicollis Ting, 1940 i c g
Data sources: i = ITIS, c = Catalogue of Life, g = GBIF, b = Bugguide.net

References

Further reading

 
 
 
 

Entiminae
Articles created by Qbugbot